Ayanu may refer to:
Workitu Ayanu, Ethiophian runner
Ayanu, Iran